Medina is a census-designated place (CDP) in Zapata County, Texas, United States. The population was 3,935 at the 2010 census.

Geography
Medina is located at  (26.93545, -99.264707).

According to the United States Census Bureau, the CDP has a total area of 1.8 square miles (4.6 km2), of which 1.8 square miles (4.6 km2) is land and 0.56% is water.

Demographics

2020 census

As of the 2020 United States census, there were 3,953 people, 1,299 households, and 1,099 families residing in the CDP.

2000 census
At the 2000 census, there were 2,960 people, 797 households and 706 families residing in the CDP. There were 999 housing units at an average density of 565.4/sq mi (217.9/km2). The racial makeup of the CDP was 81.96% White, 0.30% African American, 0.41% Native American, 0.20% Asian, 0.03% Pacific Islander, 14.80% from other races, and 2.30% from two or more races. Hispanic or Latino of any race were 93.5% of the population.

There were 797 households, of which 63.4% had children under the age of 18 living with them, 68.8% were married couples living together, 15.1% had a female householder with no husband present, and 11.3% were non-families. 10.5% of all households were made up of individuals, and 4.9% had someone living alone who was 65 years of age or older. The average household size was 3.71 and the average family size was 3.99.

42.7% of the population were under the age of 18, 11.4% from 18 to 24, 27.4% from 25 to 44, 12.0% from 45 to 64, and 6.5% who were 65 years of age or older. The median age was 22 years. For every 100 females, there were 98.4 males. For every 100 females age 18 and over, there were 94.4 males.

The median household income was $24,453 and the median family income was $25,576. Males had a median income of $19,593 versus $13,583 for females. The per capita income for the CDP was $6,342. About 38.2% of families and 48.1% of the population were below the poverty line, including 55.9% of those under age 18 and 26.3% of those age 65 or over.

References

Census-designated places in Texas
Census-designated places in Zapata County, Texas